Jón Halldórsson is a Paralympic athlete from Iceland competing mainly in category T35 sprint events. Jon won the silver medal in both the 100m and 200m at the 2004 Summer Paralympics, in both events being beaten South Africa's Teboho Mokgalagadi.  He also finished behind Tegoho in the 2008 Summer Paralympics 100m when Teboho finished third and Jon finished fifth.

Jón Halldórsson was also the name of a competitor in 1912.

References

Jon Holldorsson
Athletes (track and field) at the 2004 Summer Paralympics
Jon Holldorsson
Jon Holldorsson
Living people
Medalists at the 2004 Summer Paralympics
Year of birth missing (living people)
Place of birth missing (living people)
Paralympic medalists in athletics (track and field)